Bin Qasim can refer to either:

 Muhammad bin Qasim the eighth-century Syrian general.
 Bin Qasim Town in Karachi, Pakistan, which is named after Muhammad bin Qasim